Silverlight may refer to:

 Microsoft Silverlight, a web browser plugin that provides support for rich internet applications such as animation, vector graphics and audio-video playback.
 Terry Silverlight, American musician

See also
 Silver (disambiguation)
 Light (disambiguation)